Latin American Journal of Sedimentology and Basin Analysis (formerly Revista de la Asociación Argentina de Sedimentología) is a biannual peer-reviewed scientific journal published by the Asociación Argentina de Sedimentología. The journal covers the field of sedimentology and sedimentary basin analysis.

External links 
 

Geology journals
Geology of South America
Multilingual journals
Open access journals
Biannual journals
Academic journals published by learned and professional societies of Argentina
Publications established in 1994